Luna Marie Schweiger (born 11 January 1997) is a German actress. She is best known for her role in the 2007 film Keinohrhasen and its 2009 sequel Zweiohrküken, directed by her father Til Schweiger.

Family 
Schweiger was born on 11 January 1997 in Berlin to German actor Til Schweiger and American fashion model Dana Carlsen. She is the second of four children, after Valentin (born 1995), and the eldest daughter, before Lilli (born 1998) and Emma (born 2002). All four of them are child actors, having all first appeared in the 2007 film Keinohrhasen and its 2009 sequel Zweiohrküken, directed by their father. Her parents separated in 2005. Schweiger now lives with her mother in Hamburg.

Career 
Schweiger made her film debut as young Anna Gotzlowski in Keinohrhasen (2007), co–starring Nora Tschirner and her father Til Schweiger, who also directed the film, and reprised her role in its 2009 sequel, Zweiohrküken. In 2009, she portrayed the role of Sarah in the drama , starring Til Schweiger, Jana Pallaske and Stipe Erceg. Schweiger briefly appeared in the 2011 film Kokowääh, starring her father and sister Emma Tiger Schweiger. In 2012, she played a teenager in Schutzengel named Nina who witnessed the death of her boyfriend. In witness protection her guardian Max, played by Til Schweiger, protects her.

Filmography

References

External links 
 

1997 births
German child actresses
German film actresses
German people of American descent
Living people
Actresses from Berlin